Charles Munro may refer to:

 Charles Munro (cricketer) (1871–1969), Australian cricketer
 Charles Monro (rugby union) (1851–1933), or Munro, credited with introducing rugby union to New Zealand
 Charles H. Munro (1837–1908), physician and political figure in Nova Scotia, Canada
 Charles William Munro (1864–1919), political figure in British Columbia
 Sir Charles Munro, 9th Baronet (1795–?), Scottish baronet and soldier